Ednaldo Rodrigues Gomes (born 27 January 1954) is a Brazilian accountant, politician and sports executive, serving as the 24th and current president of the Brazilian Football Confederation (CBF).

Biography 
Rodrigues obtained a degree in Accounting from Faculdade Visconde de Cairu in Salvador in 1991, while earning similar credentials in Financial Auditing at the same college, and administrative management by Fundação Getúlio Vargas. He was an amateur soccer player in the 70s and 80s. He was president of the Liga Conquistense de Desportes Terrestres. He was also director of the Interior Department of the Federação Bahiana de Futebol (FBF), from 1992 to 2000, he was elected president of the FBF and re-elected twice more, from 2001 to 2018, and vice president of the CBF from 2018 to 2021.

He was interim president of the CBF between 2021 and 2022. On March 23, 2022, he was elected president of the CBF.

References 

1954 births
People from Vitória da Conquista
Brazilian sports executives and administrators
Presidents of the Brazilian Football Confederation
Living people